Conformal geometric algebra (CGA) is the geometric algebra constructed over the resultant space of a map from points in an -dimensional base space  to null vectors in .  This allows operations on the base space, including reflections, rotations and translations to be represented using versors of the geometric algebra; and it is found that points, lines, planes, circles and spheres gain particularly natural and computationally amenable representations.

The effect of the mapping is that generalized (i.e. including zero curvature) -spheres in the base space map onto -blades, and so that the effect of a translation (or any conformal mapping) of the base space corresponds to a rotation in the higher-dimensional space.  In the algebra of this space, based on the geometric product of vectors, such transformations correspond to the algebra's characteristic sandwich operations, similar to the use of quaternions for spatial rotation in 3D, which combine very efficiently.  A consequence of rotors representing transformations is that the representations of spheres, planes, circles and other geometrical objects, and equations connecting them, all transform covariantly.  A geometric object (a -sphere) can be synthesized as the wedge product of  linearly independent vectors representing points on the object; conversely, the object can be decomposed as the repeated wedge product of vectors representing  distinct points in its surface.  Some intersection operations also acquire a tidy algebraic form: for example, for the Euclidean base space , applying the wedge product to the dual of the tetravectors representing two spheres produces the dual of the trivector representation of their circle of intersection.

As this algebraic structure lends itself directly to effective computation, it facilitates exploration of the classical methods of projective geometry and inversive geometry in a concrete, easy-to-manipulate setting.  It has also been used as an efficient structure to represent and facilitate calculations in screw theory. CGA has particularly been applied in connection with the projective mapping of the everyday Euclidean space  into a five-dimensional vector space , which has been investigated for applications in robotics and computer vision.  It can be applied generally to any pseudo-Euclidean space - for example, Minkowski space  to the space .

Construction of CGA

Notation and terminology
In this article, the focus is on the algebra  as it is this particular algebra that has been the subject of most attention over time; other cases are briefly covered in a separate section.
The space containing the objects being modelled is referred to here as the base space, and the algebraic space used to model these objects  as the representation or conformal space.  A homogeneous subspace refers to a linear subspace of the algebraic space.

The terms for objects: point, line, circle, sphere, quasi-sphere etc. are used to mean either the geometric object in the base space, or the homogeneous subspace of the representation space that represents that object, with the latter generally being intended unless indicated otherwise.  Algebraically, any nonzero null element of the homogeneous subspace will be used, with one element being referred to as normalized by some criterion.

Boldface lowercase Latin letters are used to represent position vectors from the origin to a point in the base space.  Italic symbols are used for other elements of the representation space.

Base and representation spaces 

It can be verified, where  is in the base space, that:

These properties lead to the following formulas for the basis vector coefficients of a general vector  in the representation space for a basis with elements  orthogonal to every other basis element:

Mapping between the base space and the representation space 
The mapping from a vector in the base space (being from the origin to a point in the affine space represented) is given by the formula:

Points and other objects that differ only by a nonzero scalar factor all map to the same object in the base space.  When normalisation is desired, as for generating a simple reverse map of a point from the representation space to the base space or determining distances, the condition  may be used.

The forward mapping is equivalent to:
 first conformally projecting  from  onto a unit 3-sphere in the space  (in 5-D this is in the subspace );
 then lift this into a projective space, by adjoining , and identifying all points on the same ray from the origin (in 5-D this is in the subspace );
 then change the normalisation, so the plane for the homogeneous projection is given by the  co-ordinate having a value , i.e. .

Inverse mapping 

Origin and point at infinity 

The direction  therefore represents the (conformal) point at infinity.

The choice of the origin is arbitrary: any other point may be chosen, as the representation is of an affine space.  The origin merely represents a reference point, and is algebraically equivalent to any other point.  As with any translation, changing the origin corresponds to a rotation in the representation space.

Geometrical objects

Basis 
The Flat Point Origin is written as an outer product because the geometric product is of mixed grade.().

As the solution of a pair of equations 
Given any nonzero blade  of the representing space, the set of vectors that are solutions to a pair of homogeneous equations of the form

is the union of homogeneous 1-d subspaces of null vectors, and is thus a representation of a set of points in the base space.  This leads to the choice of a blade  as being a useful way to represent a particular class of geometric objects.  Specific cases for the blade  (independent of the number of dimensions of the space) when the base space is Euclidean space are:
 a scalar: the empty set
 a vector: a single point
 a bivector: a pair of points
 a trivector: a generalized circle
 a 4-vector: a generalized sphere
 etc.

These each may split into three cases according to whether  is positive, zero or negative, corresponding (in reversed order in some cases) to the object as listed, a degenerate case of a single point, or no points (where the nonzero solutions of  exclude null vectors).

The listed geometric objects (generalized -spheres) become quasi-spheres in the more general case of the base space being pseudo-Euclidean.

Flat objects may be identified by the point at infinity being included in the solutions.  Thus, if , the object will be a line, plane, etc., for the blade  respectively being of grade 3, 4, etc.

As derived from points of the object 

A blade  representing of one of this class of object may be found as the outer product of linearly independent vectors representing points on the object.  In the base space, this linear independence manifests as each point lying outside the object defined by the other points.  So, for example, a fourth point lying on the generalized circle defined by three distinct points cannot be used as a fourth point to define a sphere.

odds 

Points in e123 map onto the null cone—the null parabola if we set r . n∞ = -1.

We can consider the locus of points in e123 s.t. in conformal space g(x) . A = 0, for various types of geometrical object A.

We start by observing that 

compare: 
 x. a = 0 => x perp a; x.(a∧b) = 0 => x perp a and x perp b
 x∧a = 0 => x parallel to a;  x∧(a∧b) = 0 => x parallel to a or to b (or to some linear combination)

the inner product and outer product representations are related by dualisation
x∧A = 0  <=> x . A* = 0   (check—works if x is 1-dim, A is n-1 dim)

g(x) . A = 0 

 A point:  the locus of x in R3 is a point if A in R4,1 is a vector on the null cone.
(N.B. that because it's a homogeneous projective space, vectors of any length on a ray through the origin are equivalent, so g(x).A =0 is equivalent to g(x).g(a) = 0). 
 A sphere: the locus of x is a sphere if A = S, a vector off the null cone.
If  then S.X = 0 => 
these are the points corresponding to a sphere
 for a vector S off the null-cone, which directions are hyperbolically orthogonal? (cf Lorentz transformation pix)
in 2+1 D, if S is (1,a,b), (using co-ords e-, {e+, ei}), the points hyperbolically orthogonal to S are those euclideanly orthogonal to (-1,a,b)—i.e., a plane; or in n dimensions, a hyperplane through the origin.  This would cut another plane not through the origin in a line (a hypersurface in an n-2 surface), and then the cone in two points (resp. some sort of n-3 conic surface).  So it's going to probably look like some kind of conic.  This is the surface that is the image of a sphere under g.
A plane: the locus of x is a plane if A = P, a vector with a zero no component.  In a homogeneous projective space such a vector P represents a vector on the plane no=1 that would be infinitely far from the origin (ie infinitely far outside the null cone), so g(x).P =0 corresponds to x on a sphere of infinite radius, a plane.
In particular:
  corresponds to x on a plane with normal  an orthogonal distance α from the origin.
  corresponds to a plane half way between a and b, with normal a - b
circles
tangent planes
lines
lines at infinity
point pairs

Transformations 
 reflections
  It can be verified that forming P g(x) P  gives a new direction on the null-cone, g(x' ), where x'  corresponds to a reflection in the plane of points p in R3 that satisfy g(p) . P = 0.
  g(x) . A = 0  =>  P g(x) . A P = 0  =>  P g(x) P . P A P (and similarly for the wedge product), so the effect of applying P sandwich-fashion to any the quantities A in the section above is similarly to reflect the corresponding locus of points x, so the corresponding circles, spheres, lines and planes corresponding to particular types of A are reflected in exactly the same way that applying P to g(x) reflects a point x.

This reflection operation can be used to build up general translations and rotations:
 translations
 Reflection in two parallel planes gives a translation,
 
 If  and  then 

 rotations
  corresponds to an x'  that is rotated about the origin by an angle 2 θ where θ is the angle between a and b -- the same effect that this rotor would have if applied directly to x.

 general rotations
 rotations about a general point can be achieved by first translating the point to the origin, then rotating around the origin, then translating the point back to its original position, i.e. a sandwiching by the operator  so
 

 screws
 the effect a screw, or motor, (a rotation about a general point, followed by a translation parallel to the axis of rotation) can be achieved by sandwiching g(x) by the operator .
 M can also be parametrised  (Chasles' theorem)

 inversions
 an inversion is a reflection in a sphere – various operations that can be achieved using such inversions are discussed at inversive geometry.  In particular, the combination of inversion together with the Euclidean transformations translation and rotation is sufficient to express any conformal mapping – i.e. any mapping that universally preserves angles. (Liouville's theorem).

 dilations
 two inversions with the same centre produce a dilation.

Generalizations

History

Conferences and journals
There is a vibrant and interdisciplinary community around Clifford and Geometric Algebras with a wide range of applications. The main conferences in this subject include the International Conference on Clifford Algebras and their Applications in Mathematical Physics (ICCA) and Applications of Geometric Algebra in Computer Science and Engineering (AGACSE) series. A main publication outlet is the Springer journal Advances in Applied Clifford Algebras.

Notes

References

Bibliography

Books 
 Hestenes et al (2000), in G. Sommer (ed.), Geometric Computing with Clifford Algebra. Springer Verlag.  (Google books) (http://geocalc.clas.asu.edu/html/UAFCG.html Hestenes website)
 Ch. 1: New algebraic tools for classical geometry
 Ch. 2: Generalized Homogeneous Coordinates for Computational Geometry
 Ch. 3: Spherical Conformal Geometry with Geometric Algebra
 Ch. 4: A Universal Model for Conformal Geometries of Euclidean, Spherical and Double-Hyperbolic Spaces
 Hestenes (2001), in E. Bayro-Corrochano & G. Sobczyk (eds.), Advances in Geometric Algebra with Applications in Science and Engineering, Springer Verlag.  Google books
 Old Wine in New Bottles (pp. 1–14)
 Hestenes (2010), in E. Bayro-Corrochano and G. Scheuermann (2010), Geometric Algebra Computing in Engineering and Computer Science. Springer Verlag.  (Google books).
 New Tools for Computational Geometry and rejuvenation of Screw Theory
 Doran, C. and Lasenby, A. (2003), Geometric algebra for physicists, Cambridge University Press.  §10.2; p. 351 et seq
 Dorst, L. et al (2007), Geometric Algebra for Computer Science, Morgan-Kaufmann.  Chapter 13; p. 355 et seq
 Vince, J. (2008), Geometric Algebra for Computer Graphics, Springer Verlag.  Chapter 11; p. 199 et seq
 Perwass, C. (2009), Geometric Algebra with Applications in Engineering, Springer Verlag.  §4.3: p. 145 et seq
 Bayro-Corrochano, E. and Scheuermann G. (2010, eds.), Geometric Algebra Computing in Engineering and Computer Science. Springer Verlag.  pp. 3–90
 Bayro-Corrochano (2010), Geometric Computing for Wavelet Transforms, Robot Vision, Learning, Control and Action. Springer Verlag.  Chapter 6; pp. 149–183
 Dorst, L. and Lasenby, J. (2011, eds.), Guide to Geometric Algebra in Practice. Springer Verlag, pp. 3–252. .

Online resources 
 Wareham, R. (2006), Computer Graphics using Conformal Geometric Algebra, PhD thesis, University of Cambridge, pp. 14–26, 31—67
 Bromborsky, A. (2008), Conformal Geometry via Geometric Algebra (Online slides)
 Dell’Acqua, A. et al (2008), 3D Motion from structures of points, lines and planes, Image and Vision Computing, 26 529–549
 Dorst, L. (2010), Tutorial: Structure-Preserving Representation of Euclidean Motions through Conformal Geometric Algebra, in E. Bayro-Corrochano, G. Scheuermann (eds.), Geometric Algebra Computing, Springer Verlag.
 Colapinto, P. (2011), VERSOR Spatial Computing with Conformal Geometric Algebra, MSc thesis, University of California Santa Barbara
 Macdonald, A. (2013), A Survey of Geometric Algebra and Geometric Calculus. (Online notes) §4.2: p. 26 et seq.
 on the motor algebra over ℝn+1:
 Eduardo Bayro Corrochano (2001), Geometric computing for perception action systems: Concepts, algorithms and scientific applications. (Google books)

Geometric algebra
Conformal geometry
Inversive geometry
Computational geometry